Cerithium lutosum is a species of sea snail, a marine gastropod mollusk in the family Cerithiidae.

Distribution
The distribution of Cerithium lutosum includes the North America.

Description 
The maximum recorded shell length is 20 mm.

Habitat 
Minimum recorded depth is 0 m. Maximum recorded depth is 8 m.

References

External links

Cerithiidae
Gastropods described in 1828